Lawrence of Brindisi (22 July 1559 – 22 July 1619), born Giulio Cesare Russo, was a Roman Catholic priest and a theologian as well as a member of the Order of Friars Minor Capuchin. An accomplished linguist, in addition to his native Italian, Lawrence could read and speak Latin, Hebrew, Greek, German, Czech, Spanish, and French fluently. Lawrence was ordained a priest at the age of 23. Lawrence was beatified on 1 June 1783 and canonized as a saint on 8 December 1881.

Biography
Giulio Cesare Russo was born in Brindisi, Kingdom of Naples, to a family of Venetian merchants. The Conventuals of Brindisi were entrusted with his education. Showing an early gift for oratory, he was always the one chosen to address, in accordance with the Italian custom, a short sermon to his compatriots on the Infant Jesus during the Christmas festivities. He was twelve when his father died, and continued his education at Saint Mark's College in Venice under the supervision of one of his uncles. 

Cesare joined the Capuchins in Verona as Brother Lawrence. He received further instruction from the University of Padua. An accomplished linguist, in addition to his native Italian, Lawrence could read and speak Latin, Hebrew, Greek, German, Bohemian, Spanish, and French fluently. While  still a deacon he preached the Lenten sermons in Venice. Lawrence was ordained a priest at the age of 23.

At the age of thirty-one, Lawrence was elected superior of the Capuchin Franciscan province of Tuscany. In 1596 he was appointed definitor general in Rome for the Capuchins. Pope Clement VIII assigned him the task of preaching to the Jews in the city. His knowledge of the Hebrew language was of great help in this regard. Beginning in 1599, Lawrence established Capuchin monasteries in modern Germany and Austria, furthering the Counter-Reformation and bringing many Protestants back to the Catholic faith. He also founded friaries in  Vienna, Prague, and Graz.

It was on the occasion of the foundation of the convent of Prague in 1601 that he was named the imperial chaplain for the army of Rudolph II, Holy Roman Emperor, and successfully recruited Philippe Emmanuel, Duke of Mercœur, to help fight against the Ottoman Turks. He then led the army during the siege of Székesfehérvár in Hungary from the Ottoman Empire, armed only with a crucifix.

In 1602, he was elected vicar general of the Capuchin friars, at that time the highest office in the Order. He was elected again in 1605, but refused the office. Until his death, he was the best adviser of his successors. He entered the service of the Holy See, becoming papal nuncio to Bavaria. After serving as nuncio to Spain, he retired to a monastery in 1618. He was recalled as a special envoy to the King of Spain regarding the actions of the Viceroy of Naples in 1619, and after finishing his mission, died on his 60th birthday in Lisbon.

He was entombed at the Poor Clares' Convento de la Anunciada (Convent of the Annunciation) in Villafranca del Bierzo, Spain.

Favourite blessing

Veneration
He was beatified in 1783 by Pope Pius VI and was canonized in 1881 by Pope Leo XIII. In 1959 Pope John XXIII declared him Doctor of the Church with the title “Apostolic Doctor”.

Works
St. Lawrence of Brindisi Complete Works were published in 15 volumes, in a critical edition, between 1926 and 1956. They comprise:

 Mariale
 Lutheranismi hypotyposis
 Explanatio in Genesim
 Quadragesimale primum
 Quadragesimale secundum
 Quadragesimale tertium
 Quadragesimale quartum
 Adventus
 Dominicalia
 Sanctorale
 Sermones de tempore

His original manuscripts comprise 13 volumes in parchment and are located at the Archivio dei Cappuccini di Mestre.

See also
 St. Lawrence Seminary High School
 Saint Lawrence of Brindisi, patron saint archive

References

External links

 Saint Lorenzo of Brindisi
 Saint Lawrence of Brindisi
 A Homily by Lawrence of Brindisi

Italian Roman Catholic saints
Capuchins
Apostolic Nuncios to Bavaria
Apostolic Nuncios to Spain
People from Brindisi
1559 births
1619 deaths
17th-century Christian saints
Franciscan saints
Capuchin saints
Canonizations by Pope Leo XIII
Franciscan Doctors of the Church
Italian military chaplains
16th-century Italian Roman Catholic theologians
General Vicars and Ministers General of the Order of Friars Minor Capuchin
17th-century Italian Roman Catholic theologians
Beatifications by Pope Pius VI